The 1993 ECAC Hockey Men's Ice Hockey Tournament was the 32nd tournament in league history. It was played between March 9 and March 20, 1993. Preliminary and quarterfinal games were played at home team campus sites, while the 'final four' games were, for the first time, played at the Olympic Arena (subsequently renamed Herb Brooks Arena) in Lake Placid, New York.The third place game was brought back after a three year hiatus. By winning the tournament, Clarkson received the ECAC's automatic bid to the 1993 NCAA Division I Men's Ice Hockey Tournament.

Format
The tournament featured four rounds of play. The two teams that finish below tenth place in the standings are not eligible for tournament play. In the preliminary round, the seventh and tenth seeds and the eighth and ninth seeds each play a single game to determine the final qualifying teams for the quarterfinals. In the quarterfinals the first seed and lower ranked qualifier, the second and higher ranked qualifier, the third seed and sixth seed and the fourth seed and fifth seed played a modified best-of-three series, where the first team to receive 3 points moves on. After the opening round every series becomes a single-elimination game. In the semifinals, the highest seed plays the lowest remaining seed while the two remaining teams play with the winners advancing to the championship game and the losers advancing to the third place game. The tournament champion receives an automatic bid to the 1993 NCAA Division I Men's Ice Hockey Tournament.

Conference standings
Note: GP = Games played; W = Wins; L = Losses; T = Ties; PTS = Points; GF = Goals For; GA = Goals Against

Bracket
Teams are reseeded after the first two rounds

Note: * denotes overtime period(s)

Preliminary round

(7) Vermont vs. (10) Princeton

(8) Dartmouth vs. (9) Colgate

Quarterfinals

(1) Harvard vs. (10) Princeton

(2) Rensselaer vs. (9) Colgate

(3) Clarkson vs. (6) St. Lawrence

(4) Brown vs. (5) Yale

Semifinals

(1) Harvard vs. (4) Brown

(2) Rensselaer vs. (3) Clarkson

Third place

(1) Harvard vs. (2) Rensselaer

Championship

(3) Clarkson vs. (4) Brown

Tournament awards

All-Tournament Team
F Todd Marchant (Clarkson)
F Matt Mallgrave (Harvard)
F Chris Kaban (Brown)
D Guy Sanderson (Clarkson)
D Jamie O'Brien (Brown)
G Chris Rogles* (Clarkson)
* Most Outstanding Player(s)

References

External links
ECAC Hockey
1992–93 ECAC Hockey Standings
1992–93 NCAA Standings

ECAC Hockey Men's Ice Hockey Tournament
ECAC tournament